Richard Theodore Greener (1844–1922) was a pioneering African-American scholar, excelling in elocution, philosophy, law and classics in the Reconstruction era. He broke ground as Harvard College's first Black graduate in 1870. Within three years, he had also graduated from law school at the University of South Carolina, only to also be hired as its first Black professor, after briefly serving as associate editor for the New National Era, a newspaper owned and edited by Frederick Douglass.

In 1875, Greener became the first African American elected to the American Philological Association, the primary academic society for classical studies in North America. In 1876, he was admitted to practice in the Supreme Court of South Carolina, and the following year he was also admitted to the Bar of the District of Columbia. He went on to serve as dean of the Howard University School of Law.

In 1898, he became America's first Black diplomat to a white country, serving in Vladivostok, Russia. He went on to serve as an American representative during the Russo-Japanese War, but left the diplomatic service in 1905.

In 1902, the Chinese government honored him for his service to the Boxer War, and his assistance to Shansi famine sufferers. Liberia's Monrovia College awarded him an honorary Doctorate of Law in 1882, as did Howard University in 1907. Phillips Academy and the University of South Carolina both grant annual scholarships in Greener's name. Phillips Academy also named a central quadrangle after Greener in 2018, the same year the University of South Carolina honored him with a statue.

Early life and education
Richard Greener was born in Philadelphia, Pennsylvania, in 1844. He moved with his family to Boston in 1853, where he was unable to attend public school due to the colour of his skin. He was enrolled at a private school but dropped out within a few years to support his family after his father left for the California Gold Rush, and never returned to earn money to support his family. One of his employers, Franklin B. Sanborn, helped him to enroll in preparatory school (Oberlin Academy) at Oberlin College.

He then enrolled at Phillips Academy and graduated in 1865. He studied at Oberlin College for three years before transferring to Harvard College where he earned a bachelor's degree in 1870. His admission to Harvard was "an experiment" by the administration and paved the way for many more Black Harvard graduates.

While at Harvard, he earned the Bowdoin Prize for elocution twice, which the Rochester Daily Democrat mentioned in an article on August 16, 1869:

Richard Theodore Greener, a young colored man and a member of the senior class of Harvard College, is giving public readings in Philadelphia. Mr. Greener's history is that of a persevering young man who has succeeded in living down the prejudices against his race and color, and attaining by industry, ability, and good character, a position of which he may well feel proud.  He was awarded last year, at Harvard College, the prize for reading, and this year he has drilled two young white men who have likewise obtained prizes in the same branch. His course at Harvard has throughout been honorable. He is the first colored youth who has ever passed through that college.

Academic career
After graduating from Harvard, Greener served as a principal at the Institute for Colored Youth in Philadelphia from September 1870 until December 1872. He succeeded Octavius V. Catto, who was shot in a riot. From January 1 to July 1, 1873, he was principal of the Sumner High School, a colored preparatory school in Washington, D.C.

After leaving the Sumner School, Greener briefly took a job as associate editor of The New National Era in April 1873, working under editor Frederick Douglass. He was also an associate editor for the National Encyclopedia for American Biography.

University of South Carolina
In October 1873, Greener accepted the professorship of mental and moral philosophy at the University of South Carolina, where he was the university's first African-American faculty member.

He also served as a librarian there helping to "reorganize and catalog the library's holdings which were in disarray after the Civil War" and wrote a monograph on the rare books of the library. His responsibilities included assisting in the departments of Latin and Greek and teaching classes in International Law and the Constitution of the United States.

In 1875, Greener became the first African American to be elected a member of the American Philological Association, the primary academic society for classical studies in North America.

Howard Law School
Greener graduated from the law school at the University of South Carolina and was admitted to practice in the Supreme Court of South Carolina on December 20, 1876.

In June 1877, following the end of Reconstruction in South Carolina, the university was closed by Wade Hampton III. Greener moved to Washington and was admitted to the Bar of the District of Columbia on April 14, 1877. He took a position as a professor at Howard University Law School and served as dean from 1878 to 1880, succeeding John H. Cooke.

He also worked on a number of famous legal cases. He was associate counsel of Jeremiah M. Wilson in the defense of Samuel L. Perry and of Martin I. Townsend in the defense of Johnson Chesnut Whittaker in a court of inquiry in April and May 1880 where Towsend and Greener successfully gained Whittaker release and the granting of a court-martial. Greener assisted Daniel Henry Chamberlain in Whittaker's defense during the court-martial.

Public service and activism
From 1876 to 1879, Greener represented South Carolina in the Union League of America and was president of the South Carolina Republican Association in 1887 and was active in freemasonry. In 1875, Greener was appointed by the South Carolina Assembly to a commission to revise the South Carolina school system.

From 1880 until February 28, 1882, Greener served as a law clerk of the Comptroller of the United States Treasury.

In 1883, Greener and Frederick Douglass conducted a heated debate. Greener and the rising generation of Black leaders advocated moving away from political parties and white allies, while Douglass denounced them as "croakers." Greener, who nonetheless still respected Douglass's achievements, helped organize a major convention to present Black grievances to the nation. Decades had passed since the Civil War, the Emancipation Proclamation, and years since the passage of the Fourteenth and Fifteenth Amendments, but these advances had been rolled back or left unenforced, while Jim Crow laws spread in the South. Greener joined younger Black leaders in questioning Douglass, who remained loyal to the Republican Party that had first fought for Black freedom then abandoned them. Douglass accused Greener of writing anonymous attacks motivated by “ambition and jealousy” that charged the older leader with “trading off the colored vote of the country for office.” Greener wrote that there were two Douglasses, “the one velvety, deprecatory, apologetic – the other insinuating, suggestive damning with shrug, a raised eyebrow, or a look of caution.”

From 1885 to 1892, Greener served as secretary of the Grant Monument Association, where he is credited with having led the initial fundraising effort that eventually brought in donations from 90,000 people worldwide to construct Grant's Tomb. From 1885 to 1890, he was chief examiner of the civil service board for New York City and County. In the 1896 election, he served as the head of the Colored Bureau of the Republican Party in Chicago.

Just as Greener opposed Douglass, he was on the Washington side of the growing split in the African American world. On the one side was accommodationist, and therefore politically powerful and adequately funded, Booker T. Washington. On the other were Monroe Trotter, W.E.B. DuBois, and their followers, who insisted that under the Constitution they had rights and that those rights should be respected. From it were born the Niagara Conferences, and from them the NAACP. Greener was so closely allied with Washington that Washington sent him to the Second Niagara Conference with the explicit charge of spying and reporting.

Diplomat

In 1898, Greener was appointed by President William McKinley as General Consul at Bombay, India. Soon he accepted a post as United States Commercial Agent in Vladivostok, Russia. He successfully served as an American representative during the Russo-Japanese War but left the diplomatic service in 1905.

Personal life
On September 24, 1874, Greener married Genevieve Ida Fleet, and they had six children.

Greener separated from his wife upon his posting to Vladivostok and took a Japanese common-law wife, Mishi Kawashima, with whom he had three children.

Though they never divorced, Fleet and her daughters changed their name to "Greene" to disassociate themselves from him. One of his daughters, Belle da Costa Greene, became the personal librarian to J. P. Morgan and passed for white.

Later life and death

Greener settled in Chicago with relatives. He held a job as an agent for an insurance company, practiced law, and occasionally lectured on his life and times. He died of natural causes in Chicago on May 2, 1922, aged 78. He was buried at Graceland Cemetery.

His Harvard diploma and other personal papers were rediscovered in an attic in the South Side of Chicago in the early 21st century. A great deal of discussion surrounds where the papers should be archived.

Legacy

Along with having accomplished many African-American firsts, Greener earned several awards in his lifetime.

In 1902, the Chinese government decorated him with the Order of the Double Dragon for his service to the Boxer War and assistance to Shansi famine sufferers.

He received two honorary Doctorates of Laws, from Monrovia College in Liberia in 1882 and Howard University in 1907. Phillips Academy and University of South Carolina both grant annual scholarships in Greener's name.

The central quadrangle at Phillips Academy was named in honor of Greener in 2018. The University of South Carolina erected a statue of Greener.

In 2009, some of his personal papers were discovered in the attic of an abandoned home on the south side of Chicago by a member of a demolition crew.

On February 21, 2018, a nine-foot statue of Greener was unveiled at the University of South Carolina. It stands in front of the Thomas Cooper Library.

References

Further reading
Anderson, Christian K. and Jason C. Darby (2021). “Richard T. Greener at the Reconstruction-era University: Professor, Librarian, and Student.” In Robert Greene II and Tyler D. Parry (Eds.), Invisible No More: The African American Experience at the University of South Carolina (pp. 51–72). Columbia, SC: University of South Carolina Press.

 

  for electronic book.

External links
 Richard T. Greener Website
 Phillips Academy quad to be named for Greener

South Carolina lawyers
Lawyers from Washington, D.C.
African-American lawyers
African-American legal scholars
African-American people
Classics educators
American legal scholars
American librarians
African-American librarians
American diplomats
Howard University faculty
Harvard College alumni
Oberlin College alumni
Phillips Academy alumni
South Carolina Republicans
New York (state) Republicans
Illinois Republicans
19th-century African-American people
20th-century African-American people
1844 births
1922 deaths
Burials at Graceland Cemetery (Chicago)